Eulaliopsis is a genus of Asian plants in the grass family.

Species
 Eulaliopsis binata (Retz.) C.E.Hubb. - Guangdong, Guangxi, Guizhou, Henan, Hubei, Shaanxi, Sichuan, Taiwan, Yunnan, Afghanistan, Arunachal Pradesh, Bhutan, Assam, Sikkim, Uttarakhand, Himachal Pradesh, Jammu & Kashmir, Japan, Myanmar, Nepal, Pakistan, Philippines, Thailand
 Eulaliopsis sykesii Bor - Nepal, Sikkim

References

Andropogoneae
Grasses of Asia
Grasses of China
Poaceae genera